The Church of Our Lady of Lourdes, is a Catholic church located in the Brazilian city of Canela, Rio Grande do Sul. It is erroneously known as the Cathedral of Stone (although the church is not actually a cathedral. It is considered one of the major tourist attractions of the Serra Gaúcha. 

Its characteristic style is English Gothic. The church has a tower with 65 meters high, and a carillon of 12 bells made of bronze by foundry Giacomo Crespi, Italy. In its interior are three panels consisting of painted canvases by the gaucho artist Marciano Schmitz, depicting the "Apparition of Our Lady", the "Allegory of the Angels", and "Annunciation". The paintings of Via Sacra were made by Pablo Herrera, a Uruguayan sculptor and restorer of Sacred Art. Wood and clay were used, with the background painting having superimposed images in clay.

Its stained glasses represent the litany of Our Lady. The altar, whose theme is the Last Supper, is a work of art carved in by wood Julius Tixe, a Uruguayan sculptor.

Note

References

External links 

 History of the Cathedral of Our Lady of Lourdes 
 Cathedral of Stone 

Roman Catholic churches completed in 1987
Gothic Revival church buildings in Brazil
Religious buildings and structures in Rio Grande do Sul
20th-century Roman Catholic church buildings in Brazil